Margaret Olive Wellington (23 December 1926 – 10 March 2015) was a British swimmer.

Swimming career
Wellington won a bronze medal at the 1947 European Aquatics Championships in the 4 × 100 m freestyle relay. She finished fourth in the same event at the 1948 Summer Olympics.

She represented England in Auckland, New Zealand at the 1950 British Empire Games where she won three silver medals, in the 110 yd and 440 yd freestyle and 3×110 yd medley relay, and a bronze in the 4×110 yd freestyle relay. She won the 1948 ASA National Championship 110 yards freestyle title, the 1949 ASA National Championship 220 yards freestyle title  and the 1949 ASA National Championship 440 yards freestyle title.

References

1926 births
2015 deaths
Swimmers at the 1950 British Empire Games
Commonwealth Games silver medallists for England
Commonwealth Games bronze medallists for England
Swimmers at the 1948 Summer Olympics
Olympic swimmers of Great Britain
British female freestyle swimmers
European Aquatics Championships medalists in swimming
Commonwealth Games medallists in swimming
20th-century British women
Medallists at the 1950 British Empire Games